Burning Horizon at the End of Dawn is the second studio album by the death metal band The Mandrake. It was released on Crash Music in 2004.

Track listing

References

External links 
 Homepage
 Metal Side Review

2004 albums
The Mandrake (band) albums